The 1916 Mansfield by-election was held on 20 September 1916.  The by-election was held due to the death of the incumbent Liberal MP, Arthur Markham.  It was won by the Liberal candidate Charles Seely.

Vacancy

The by-election was held due to the death of the incumbent Liberal MP, Arthur Markham.

supported by Horatio Bottomley

References

1916 elections in the United Kingdom
1916 in England
20th century in Nottinghamshire
Mansfield
By-elections to the Parliament of the United Kingdom in Nottinghamshire constituencies